Pauline Adele Thompson (1942 – 27 July 2012) was a New Zealand painter. Her style can be described as romantic-realist. She exhibited with the Auckland Society of Arts and in the New Women Artists exhibition at the Govett-Brewster Art Gallery in 1984.

Thompson was born in 1942, the daughter of Walter Kirkpatrick Thompson and Marie Gabrielle Buffett. She died on Auckland's North Shore on 27 July 2012.

Notable works
Pauline Thompson's works include 'Suzanne Aubert at the Mirror'. She created a series of painting based on her ancestor, Mauatua, and other Pitcairn Islanders.

References

Further reading
Artist files for Pauline Thompson are held at:
 Angela Morton Collection, Takapuna Library
 E. H. McCormick Research Library, Auckland Art Gallery Toi o Tāmaki
 Robert and Barbara Stewart Library and Archives, Christchurch Art Gallery Te Puna o Waiwhetu
 Fine Arts Library, University of Auckland
 Hocken Collections Uare Taoka o Hākena
 Te Aka Matua Research Library, Museum of New Zealand Te Papa Tongarewa
 

1942 births
2012 deaths
New Zealand painters
New Zealand women painters
People associated with the Museum of New Zealand Te Papa Tongarewa
People associated with the Auckland Society of Arts